The 2016 America East Conference men's soccer season was the 21st season of women's varsity soccer in the conference.

Teams

Stadia and locations

Regular season

Rankings

Postseason

AmEast tournament

Tournament details to be announced.

NCAA tournament

All-AEast awards and teams

See also 
 2016 NCAA Division I women's soccer season
 2016 America East Women's Soccer Tournament
 2016 America East Conference men's soccer season

References 

 
2016 NCAA Division I women's soccer season